Franck Marchis (born April 6, 1973 in Caen, France), astronomer and planetary scientist, is best known for his discovery and characterization of multiple asteroids, his study of Io volcanism and imaging of exoplanets, planets around other stars.

The asteroid 6639 Marchis was named in his honor on April 4, 2007.

In 2017, he joined Unistellar as Chief Science Officer and co-founder where he is in charge of the development of Citizen Science, education and outreach program.

Background 
Marchis was born in France.  He is currently a Principal Investigator at the SETI Institute. He received his Ph.D. in 2000 from university of Toulouse, France in planetary science. Although his thesis was performed while living in several places: Mexico, France, Great-Britain; the main part of his studies were made while working at La Silla observatory in Chile for the European Southern Observatory, an intergovernmental organization aiming to develop astronomy in the southern hemisphere. He participated in the development of observations with the first adaptive optics system available to a large community (called ADONIS on the 3.6m telescope). He moved to California shortly after receiving his Ph.D. in November 2000 through a postdoctoral position  at UC Berkeley.
Since then, he has dedicated most of his activity monitoring Io's volcanism with the Keck-10m telescope and the support of CfAO, an NSF science and technology center. In 2003, he was hired as an assistant researcher at UC Berkeley to conduct his research more independently and expanded it to a broader field, but still based on high angular resolution capabilities. In 2007, he was appointed as a Planetary Scientist at the Carl Sagan Center of the SETI Institute where he expanded his research on multiple asteroids using space-telescope facilities (HST, Spitzer telescope) and participating to development of space mission concepts to explore these new worlds. In June 2011, he took a full-time position at the Carl Sagan Center to lead the development of space mission concepts and new high-resolution & high contrast instruments for ground-based telescopes. He currently leads the Education and public outreach program of the Gemini Planet Imager, an instrument dedicated to the search of exoplanets, using direct imaging, spectroscopy and polarimetry which initiated its search campaign in March 2015.
He has also taught on several occasions "The Planets" class at UC-Berkeley (Astro 12) and several classes in Spanish in Chile. He is an associate astronomer at Observatoire de Paris since June 2003, IMCCE. (ref [1]). He has appeared and has been a science advisor of several TV shows and documentaries linked to his work on the search for life in our universe and the study of Io's volcanism and asteroids.

Discovery of companions of asteroids 
Marchis exploited the high-resolution capabilities offered by adaptive optics from groundbased telescope to survey hundreds of main belt asteroids and Trojans.
Together with his team, they announced the discovery of the first triple asteroid system in August 2005 (87 Sylvia), and the first measurement of a Trojan bulk-density in February 2006 (617 Patroclus). Both discoveries were published in Nature journal (ref [2], [3])

In July 2006, Marchis and his team announced the discovery of a moonlet companion around 624 Hektor using the Keck Laser guide star AO system (ref [4]). This is the first multiple system in the L4 swarm and the first moonlet companion in the Trojan discovered.

The second triple system orbiting in the main-belt was discovered by the same team and announced in March 2007. Subsequent analysis of VLT-NACO images taken in Jan. 2004 revealed the presence of a second 6-km size moonlet orbiting around (45) Eugenia. Since 1999, this system was known to have a large moonlet, called Petit-Prince (~15 km) orbiting at 1200 km. ref[6]. In December 2014, the team led by Bin Yang re-observed a binary asteroid system 130 Elektra with the new Extreme AO system SPHERE of the VLT UT4 telescope and detected a smaller and closer satellite not yet seen on previous AO data.

Volcanic activity of Io 
Using high imaging capability available on ground-based telescopes equipped with adaptive optics systems, F. Marchis and his team monitor and study the exotic volcanism of Io, Galilean satellite of Jupiter.
In February 2001, they witnessed the most energetic eruption ever seen on the solar system. Surt volcano, located on the north hemisphere of Io, was then starting an extremely active eruption. The observed energy indicates the presence of a vigorous, high-temperature volcanic eruption. The kind of eruption to produce this thermal signature has incandescent fire fountains of molten lava which are kilometers high, propelled at great speed out of the ground by expanding gases, accompanied by extensive lava flows on the surface. The Surt eruption appears to cover an area of 1,900 square kilometers, which is larger than the city of Los Angeles and even larger than the entire city of London [5].

References

Sources
 [1] SFAA-Astronomy Lecture - Bio
 [2] Discovery of the First Triple Asteroid System, Nature, Aug. 2005
 [3] A low density of 0.8 g cm-3 for the Trojan binary asteroid 617 Patroclus, Nature, Feb. 2006
 [4] IAU Circular 8732 Aug. 2006
 [5] EXCEPTIONALLY BRIGHT ERUPTION ON IO RIVALS LARGEST IN SOLAR SYSTEM
 [6] Discovery of a second moonlet orbiting around (45) Eugenia

External links 
 Franck Marchis' homepage
 Franck Marchis' page at SETI Institute
 Rubble-Pile Minor Planet Sylvia and Her Twins ESO PR
 First triple asteroid system found, UC-Berkeley, PR
 Binary asteroid in Jupiter's orbit may be icy comet from solar system's infancy, UC-Berkeley PR
 Unique Triple Asteroid System Discovered, Scientific American
 Solar system's first triple asteroid system found, NewScientist
 Scientists discover asteroid with moons Tiny planetary system orbiting between Mars and Jupiter, San Francisco Chronicle, Aug. 11 2005

American astronomers
1973 births
Living people
Planetary scientists